Oberdiebach is an Ortsgemeinde – a municipality belonging to a Verbandsgemeinde, a kind of collective municipality – in the Mainz-Bingen district in Rhineland-Palatinate, Germany.

Geography

Location
Oberdiebach lies between Koblenz and Bad Kreuznach. The winegrowing centre belongs to the Verbandsgemeinde of Rhein-Nahe, whose seat is in Bingen am Rhein, although that town is not within its bounds. Since 2003, Oberdiebach has been part of the Rhine Gorge UNESCO World Heritage Site.

Constituent communities
Oberdiebach's Ortsteile are Oberdiebach, Rheindiebach and Winzberg.

History
In 893, Oberdiebach had its first documentary mention. In 1220, Fürstenberg Castle (Burg Fürstenberg) was built by the Elector of Cologne on the border with Electoral Mainz. In 1461, Rheindiebach (Dyepach Ryne) had its first documentary mention. In 1689, the French destroyed Fürstenberg Castle. In 1822, the men's singing club MGV “Eintracht” was founded and is today one of Rhineland-Palatinate's oldest singing clubs.

Politics

Municipal council
The council is made up of 13 council members, counting the part-time mayor, with seats apportioned thus:

(as at municipal election held on 13 June 2004)

Culture and sightseeing

Buildings
In the constituent community of Oberdiebach stands Saint Maurice's Parish Church (Pfarrkirche St. Mauritius, 1414) with an altarpiece and an iron pulpit. In the constituent community of Rheindiebach stand the ruins of Fürstenberg Castle and the “Half Tower” (halber Turm), formerly part of the Gothic fortifications. Great parts of the fortifications had to give way in the latter half of the 20th century to expansions to Bundesstraße 9.

Economy and infrastructure
Oberdiebach's economy is based on winegrowing. Tourism only plays s small part.

Transport
Running right through the municipality is Bundesstraße 9, which links Mainz with Koblenz. The Rheinböllen interchange on the Autobahn A 61 lies roughly 11 km away. The nearest railway station is in Niederheimbach on the Mainz-Koblenz line.

References

External links

Municipality’s official webpage 
Rhine Gorge UNESCO World Heritage Site
Welt der Burgen (“World of Castles”)

Documents
Bild von Rheindiebach aus J.F. Dielmann, A. Fay, J. Becker (Zeichner): F.C. Vogels Panorama des Rheins, Bilder des rechten und linken Rheinufers, Lithographische Anstalt F.C. Vogel, Frankfurt 1833

Mainz-Bingen